Bolu Okupe (born 20 January 1994) is an openly gay Nigerian LGBTQ rights activist, model, and son of former Nigerian presidential aide Doyin Okupe. On 20 January 2021, he came out as a gay man through an Instagram post on his personal account and has faced several backlashes from homophobic Nigerians.

Personal life 
In an interview, he stated that he knew he was gay around the age of 10. He also revealed his plans to have children of his own in the future.

References 

1994 births
Living people
Nigerian gay men
Nigerian LGBT rights activists